United States gubernatorial elections were held on November 4, 1969, in two states and one territory, with a January 7 special election held in Maryland. Republicans achieved a net gain of one in these elections.

Election results
A bolded state name features an article about the specific election.

*Note: Special election which occurred on January 7, 1969.

Notes

References

 
November 1969 events in the United States